is a Japanese professional racing cyclist. She rode at the 2015 UCI Track Cycling World Championships. She also competed at the 2014 Asian Games.

Major results

2014
2nd Omnium, South Australian Track Classic
2nd Points Race, Japan Track Cup 1
2nd Omnium, Japan Track Cup 2
2015
Track Clubs ACC Cup
1st Omnium
1st Points Race
Asian Track Championships
3rd  Points Race
3rd  Team Pursuit (with Kanako Kase, Kisato Nakamura and Minami Uwano)
2016
Asian Track Championships
2nd  Team Pursuit (with Yumi Kajihara, Kisato Nakamura and Minami Uwano)
3rd Omnium
Japan Track Cup
2nd Points Race
3rd Omnium
2nd Omnium, ITS Melbourne Grand Prix
2nd Omnium, ITS Melbourne DISC Grand Prix

References

1991 births
Living people
Japanese female cyclists
Place of birth missing (living people)
Cyclists at the 2014 Asian Games
Olympic cyclists of Japan
Cyclists at the 2016 Summer Olympics
Asian Games competitors for Japan
20th-century Japanese women
21st-century Japanese women